Hossein Lankarani was an Iranian Shia cleric and politician who served as a member of parliament in the 14th Iranian Majlis.

Prynce Hopkins describes Lankarani as "liberal". According to Sepehr Zabih, during 1943 Iranian election in Azerbaijan, the Soviet Union favored to get Lankarani elected and banished his rival from the city to ensure his success, due to the fact he was known to oppose the ruling class in Tehran and advocated friendship towards the Soviets.

References

1895 births
1989 deaths
Members of the 14th Iranian Majlis
Deputies of Ardabil, Nir, Namin and Sareyn
Iranian Shia clerics